Summit Bank is a Pakistani commercial bank, which is a subsidiary of Suroor Investment and is in Karachi, Pakistan., a Mauritius investment company. It has a network of 193 branches across the country.

History
In 2007, Arif Habib Securities Limited acquired Pakistan Operations of Rupali Bank Limited, under the Scheme of Amalgamation by the State Bank of Pakistan.

In 2010, Suroor Investments Ltd. acquired a 59.41% stake in Arif Habib Bank Ltd. Suroor Investments is an investment firm based in Mauritius. Later in 2010, Arif Habib Bank Ltd. was rebranded under the name of Summit Bank Ltd.

Suroor Investments Ltd. acquired the majority shares of Atlas Bank Ltd. and MyBank Ltd. and these banks were later on came under the umbrella of Summit Bank Ltd., increasing the network of the bank to over 193 branches in the country.

Majority Shareholding 
Dubai-based businessman, Nasser Abdullah Hussain Lootah, has shown intention to acquire majority shareholding (at least 51 percent) of Summit Bank Limited while ensuring that the bank complies with the minimum capital requirements and capital adequacy ratio prescribed by the State Bank of Pakistan.

References

External links

 https://summitbank.com.pk/

Banks of Pakistan
Companies based in Karachi
Banks established in 2006
Pakistani companies established in 2006
Companies listed on the Pakistan Stock Exchange
Pakistani subsidiaries of foreign companies
Mergers and acquisitions of Pakistani companies